Harding is a town situated in the Mzimkulwana River valley, Ugu District Municipality of KwaZulu-Natal, South Africa

Background
Harding was established as a military outpost following the British annexation of East Griqualand in 1874. Named after Sir Walter Harding (c 1812-1874) who in 1858 became the first Chief Justice in Natal. It was declared as a township in 1911.

Timber and dairy farming are the main economic activities. The abandoned  narrow gauge Alfred County Railway used to serve the farming areas, linking Harding with Port Shepstone. Harding lies at the foot of the Ingeli Range, 34 km north-west of Izingolweni and 84 km north-west of Port Shepstone.

Administration
Harding is located in the uMuziwabantu Local Municipality which is located in the larger Ugu District Municipality which governs the KwaZulu-Natal South Coast. It is the municipal seat of the uMuziwabantu Local Municipality which governs Harding, Weza and its surroundings.

References 

Populated places in the uMuziwabantu Local Municipality